Mellon National Bank Building (also known as Lord & Taylor Department Store) at 514 Smithfield Street in downtown Pittsburgh, Pennsylvania, was completed in 1924 after Mellon acquired the property in August 1916 from the Baltimore & Ohio Railroad which had their regional offices on the site.  Prior to the B&O office the site was the original home to the city's first public high school (Central High) which opened in the fall of 1855.  The Classical styled building was designed by architects Trowbridge & Livingston with Edward Mellon.  It was added to the List of Pittsburgh History and Landmarks Foundation Historic Landmarks in 1976, and the List of City of Pittsburgh historic designations in July 1999.

On July 30, 1999, May & Co. bought the structure for $9.250 million from Mellon ending branch services at the site.  The building was converted into a multi-level department store despite the protests of historical preservationists.  It opened as Lord & Taylor on November 1, 2000, after a $12 million refurbishment ( in  dollars).

On May 31, 2012 PNC Financial Services purchased the structure after Lord & Taylor closed in 2004.

References

External links
News article

Buildings and structures in Pittsburgh
Neoclassical architecture in Pennsylvania
Commercial buildings completed in 1924